Inger Margareta Davidson née Windblad (2 December 1944), is a Swedish retired Christian Democrat politician.

He was an Elementary school teacher from 1969 to 1987, party secretary from 1989 to 1991, Minister for Civil Service Affairs from 1991 to 1994 and member of the Riksdag from 1991 to 2010.

External links
Inger Davidson at the Riksdag website

1944 births
21st-century Swedish women politicians
Living people
Members of the Riksdag 1991–1994
Members of the Riksdag 1994–1998
Members of the Riksdag 1998–2002
Members of the Riksdag 2002–2006
Members of the Riksdag from the Christian Democrats (Sweden)
Women members of the Riksdag